para-Iodoamphetamine (PIA), also known as 4-iodoamphetamine (4-IA), is a research chemical of the phenethylamine and amphetamine chemical classes.

It acts as a selective serotonin releasing agent and is also a MAOI.

PIA is rumored to be a serotonergic neurotoxin on the account of that being reported to be the case for para-chloroamphetamine.

However, PIA is a much weaker 5-HT neurotoxin than is the case for PCA.

Analogs
5-IAI was an attempt to make a non-neurotoxic analog of PIA.

See also 
 p-Bromoamphetamine
 p-Chloroamphetamine
 p-Fluoroamphetamine
 Iofetamine

References 

Neurotoxins
Substituted amphetamines
Iodoarenes
Serotonin-norepinephrine-dopamine releasing agents